Dover Heights is a coastal, eastern suburb of Sydney, in the state of New South Wales, Australia. Dover Heights is 9 kilometres east of the Sydney central business district, in the local government area of Waverley Council. Its postcode is 2030.

Location

Dover Heights borders Vaucluse to its north, North Bondi to its south and Rose Bay to its west and has the Pacific Ocean to its east.

Dover Heights is a mainly residential suburb. Many of the suburb's properties have views of Sydney Harbour and the Sydney Harbour Bridge. Some properties have both harbour and ocean views. Dudley Page Reserve has panoramic views over Sydney Harbour and is a popular site for sunsets and picnics. The Dover Heights Coastal Reserves are part of the Bondi to Watsons Bay Cliff Walk and have stunning ocean views.  The Dover Heights Coastal Reserves are formed by the contiguous Weonga Reserve, Rodney Reserve and Raleigh Reserve.

The suburb is considered to be the most affluent within the Waverly Local Government Area, and amongst the most affluent suburbs in Australia. This is reflected in property prices - like nearby suburbs Vaucluse and Bellevue Hill, median house prices are above A$6.4 million. The ATO's 2014-2015 taxation statistics listed Dover Height's postcode, 2030 as the second richest in Australia with an average taxable income of $185,684.  Dover Heights shares the 2030 postcode with the neighboring suburbs of Rose Bay North, Vaucluse & Watsons Bay.

History

Dover Heights is believed to have been named for its cliffs along the Pacific Ocean which resembled those found at Dover, in Kent, England. The first mention of Dover Heights appeared in municipal records in 1886. The area was first used for market gardens.

In 1830 land in the area was owned by Daniel Cooper (1785–1853), a partner in the firm Cooper and Levey, who owned the Waterloo Stores. The retailing emporium was located on the corner of George Street and Market Street in the city, on the site that was later occupied by Gowings Brothers retailers until 2006. The Dover Heights area was subdivided in 1913.

Population
At the 2016 census, there were 3,802 residents in Dover Heights. 53.7% of people were born in Australia. The most common countries of birth were South Africa 14.8% and England 3.6%. 75.0% of people only spoke English at home. Other languages spoken at home included Russian 3.1% and Hebrew 2.7%. The most common responses for religion were Judaism 48.5%, No Religion 16.6% and Catholic 11.0%.  According to the demographic community profile of id.com.au created from the 2016 census, Dover Heights is the suburb with the highest Jewish population by percent in Australia.

The median weekly household income was $3,031 and 50.3%	of households had a weekly income of more than $3,000. Housing costs were high in Dover Heights with the median monthly mortgage payment being $4,000.

Architecture
With both cliff top and city views, Dover Heights has a number of homes of architectural interest which have received awards

The Butterfly House – 197 Military Road, Dover Heights - designed by award-winning architect Ed Lippmann

Moebius House –  - 129 Military Road, Dover Heights - designed by architect Tony Owen

Light House – 10 Wentworth Street, Dover Heights - designed by architect Peter Stutchbury

Winner of the Wilkinson Award by the Royal Australian Institute of Architects in 2015

The Cliff House –   8 Wentworth Street, Dover Heights

The Wave Dover Heights – 185 /185A Military Road - designed by architects Paul Brough & Andre Baroukh

Winner of the 2015 Master Builders Association Award of Australia - National Medium Density – 2 to 5 Dwellings

Winner of the 2015 Master Builders Association NSW Award For Town House / Villas / Dual Occupancy Over $1,000,000The Holman House  – 20 Hunter Street, Dover Heights

Winner of the Wilkinson Award by the Royal Australian Institute of Architects in 2005

1 George Street – Dover Height

21 Hunter Street – Dover Heights

57 Eastern Ave, Dover Heights

12 Douglas Parade, Dover Heights

Radio Astronomy

During the Second World War, Rodney Reserve, at the Dover Heights clifftop, was used by the Royal Australian Air Force for coastal defence radar. The CSIRO further used the site for pioneering experimentation in radio astronomy related to galactic radio emissions, with a team including John Gatenby Bolton first observing solar emissions in 1945.  The site primarily made use of Yagi antennas.  The first radio source they identified with something that could be seen was in the constellation Taurus, and named Taurus A, which is in fact the Crab Nebula, a supernova remnant (the remains of an exploding star) first reported by Chinese astronomers in the year 1054.

References

The Book of Sydney Suburbs, Compiled by Frances Pollen, Angus & Robertson Publishers, 1990, Published in Australia

Further reading
 Bolton, J. "Radio astronomy at Dover Heights," Proceedings of the Astronomical Society of Australia, 4, 349-358 (1982).
 CSIRO, "Radio astronomy at Dover Heights"
 Orchiston, W. & B. Slee, "Ingenuity and Inititative in Australian Radio Astronomy: The Dover Heights ‘Hole-in-the-Ground’ Antenna," Jour. Astron. History & Heritage 5, 21-34 (2002).
 Stanley, G. J., "Recollections of John G. Bolton at Dover-Heights and Caltech," Australian Journal of Physics 47, 507-16 (1994).
 Wild, J.P. & V.R. Radhakrishnan, "Heights John Gatenby Bolton 1922-1993," Historical Records of Australian Science 10–4, 381-391 (1995).

External links 

Suburbs of Sydney
Waverley Council